Mogharrab-e Do (also known as Maghreb, Mogharrab, Moqarreb, Moqarreb-e, and Qaryeh-ye Moqarreb) is a village in Rahmatabad Rural District, Zarqan District, Shiraz County, Fars Province, Iran. At the 2006 census, its population was 122, in 31 families.

References 

Populated places in Zarqan County